This is a list of universities in the former Netherlands Antilles.

American University of the Caribbean, Sint Maarten.
Caribbean Medical University, Curaçao 
Saba University School of Medicine 
Ballsbridge University Curacao
Saint James School of Medicine, Bonaire 
University of Curacao, Curaçao (Dutch: Universiteit van de Nederlandse Antillen) 
The University of America Curacao (Curacao)
University of Sint Eustatius School of Medicine
University of St. Martin, Sint Maarten

 
Universities
Netherlands Antilles
Netherlands Antilles